Waterpark City is a condominium project in Toronto near Fort York and the Canadian National Exhibition, beside the site of the former Molson brewery. It stands at 38 floors, 409 units, and 114 metres. The building architect is  Page + Steele, and it was developed by Lanterra Developments. The two current standing buildings are named Atlantis and Aquarius. The 38 and 16 story condos named "Neptune" are currently under construction.

It is one of many condominium projects in the Fort York Neighbourhood.

References

 Simply Condos: Water Park City
 Official site

Residential skyscrapers in Toronto
Residential condominiums in Canada